Kokubun (written: 国分 or 國分) is a Japanese surname. The kanji used to write this surname may also be read Kokubu.

Notable people with the surname Kokubun include:

Russell S. Kokubun (born 1948), American politician
 (born 1953), Japanese academic and author
 (born 1991), Japanese figure skater
 (born 1974), Japanese musician and actor
 (born 1983), Japanese voice actress

Notable people with the surname Kokubu include:

 (born , 1973), Japanese impressionist (monomane tarento)
 (1553–1615), Japanese samurai of the Sengoku through early Edo period
 (born 1976), Japanese actress and fashion model
 (born 1994), Japanese football player

See also 
 Kokubu (disambiguation)
  (disambiguation)

Japanese-language surnames